The Top – Dyskoteki (Polish Dance Club Singles Chart) is a chart compiled by dj organization DJ Promotion from the most popular songs in the clubs. based on dj weekly online reports. Although the chart does not currently receive any airplay on the radio or television, the chart can be viewed on the DJ Promotion and Polish Society of the Phonographic Industry website.

Complete weekly report includes a list of the hundreds of items, but only officially published the top 50.

See also
Polish music charts
List of number-one dance singles in Poland

External links
 at ZPAV

Official Dance Charts - archive since July 9, 2012

Dance music
Polish music
Polish record charts